Hipodrom is a railway station in Ankara, Turkey. The station is served by the Sincan-Kayaş Commuter Line and the Ankara-Polatlı Regional. Hipodrom was formerly known as Hastane.

Railway stations in Ankara Province
Railway stations opened in 1972